Colette Libourel (born 26 December 1940) is a French former butterfly and freestyle swimmer. She competed in two events at the 1960 Summer Olympics.

References

External links
 

1940 births
Living people
French female butterfly swimmers
French female freestyle swimmers
Olympic swimmers of France
Swimmers at the 1960 Summer Olympics
Swimmers from Paris
20th-century French women
21st-century French women